Bodoc  is a commune in Covasna County, Transylvania, Romania composed of three villages: Bodoc, Olteni (Oltszem) and Zălan (Zalán).

It formed part of the Székely Land region of the historical Transylvania province.

Demographics

The commune has an absolute Székely Hungarian majority. According to the 2002 Census it has a population of 2,541 of which 94.77% or 2,408 are Hungarian.

References

Communes in Covasna County
Localities in Transylvania